The Sŏho Line is an electrified  narrow gauge railway line of the Korean State Railway in Hamhŭng-si, North Korea, running from Hamhŭng to Hŭngnam and Sŏho.

History

During the Japanese colonial era, the privately owned Sinhŭng Railway built a network of  narrow-gauge railways around Hamhŭng. These were the Hamnam Line, the Jangjin Line, and the Songheung Line opened between 1923 and 1933, and the Namhŭng Line, which was opened in three sections between 1934 and 1936.

The Sinhŭng Railway was bought by the Chosen Railway on 22 April 1938.

After the defeat of Japan in the Pacific War and the subsequent partition of Korea, the entirety of the line, being north of the 38th parallel, was located in the Soviet zone of occupation; on 10 August 1946, the Provisional People's Committee for North Korea nationalised all railways within its jurisdiction, including the Namhŭng Line, and it has since been operated by the Korean State Railway.

Originally built entirely as a narrow gauge line, frequent accidents on the line led the Korean State Railway to convert the Hamhŭng—Sinhŭng section of the Sinhŭng Line to standard gauge for greater safety and increased transportation capacity; after the regauging of this section was completed, West Hamhŭng station was disconnected from the Sinhŭng line. When Naeho Station was closed, the line between Hadŏk and Sŏho was realigned to the current, shorter alignment.

In 2017, the line was reconstructed with the participation of the Hamhung Narrow Gauge Railroad office, Yonggwang Yonju plant and organised by the South Hamgyong provincial party office. Stations, sleepers and concrete poles were all replaced. Hungdok station was rebuilt as a model station.

Services

The Sŏho Line is used exclusively for passenger trains for commuters.

Route
The pink background indicates that that section is electrified  narrow gauge.

Rolling stock 
The line uses Charyokkaengsang-class locomotives (Korean: 자력갱생) originally built by Kim Chong-t'ae Electric Locomotive Works. They have 551kW motors and haul a number of passenger cars. These locomotives underwent complete body replacement by the 8 February Vinylon Factory and the Hamhung Narrow Gauge Office in 2017 and received a blue and white exterior along with the reconstruction of the line. Previously, the locomotives were yellow and red. A total of 8 locomotives and 22 passenger cars which were overhauled.

References

 

Railway lines in North Korea
2 ft 6 in gauge railways in North Korea